In the Key of G is the ninth studio album by British-Irish singer-songwriter Gilbert O'Sullivan, released on January 1, 1989. Union Square Music re-released it on April 8, 2013 on the Salvo label as part of the Gilbert O'Sullivan - A Singer and His Songs collection.

Track listing 
All songs written by Gilbert O'Sullivan.
 "Lost a Friend" - 3:06
 "At the Very Mention of Your Name" - 5:25
 "What Am I Doing Here with You" - 4:09
 "If I Start with the Chorus" - 2:39
 "So What" - 4:18
 "The Way Things Used to Be" - 4:43
 "I Don't Trust Men with Earrings in Their Ears" - 4:01
 "Gordon Bennett" - 4:46
 "To the Extreme" - 3:40
 "Stick in the Mud" - 3:39

Bonus tracks on the 2013 remaster
 "I Have My Coat to Keep Me Warm" (from the single "Two's Company (Three Is Allowed)") - 3:30
 "Forever Wondering" (from the album Frobisher Drive) - 3:55
 "At the Very Mention of Your Name" (single version) - 4:48
 "In a Nutshell" (B-side of "So What") - 2:52
 "So What" (instrumental extended mix) - 5:04

References

 In the Key of G, CD booklet, 2013

External links 
Official Gilbert O'Sullivan page

1989 albums
Gilbert O'Sullivan albums
Albums produced by Chris Tsangarides
Albums produced by Gus Dudgeon
Albums produced by David Foster